Madō Monogatari is a series of first-person dungeon crawler role-playing video games by Compile. The first game was released in 1990 for MSX2. Sega published the Game Gear remakes based on 1-2-3. The characters of this series would later be used in the puzzle game Puyo Puyo.

Plot

Characters 

 Arle Nadja – The main protagonist of the series.
 Monsters – The main antagonists of the series.

Gameplay
Gameplay combines role-playing elements with some unique twists. For example, there are no numeric stats; instead, everything is represented by character facial expressions and sprites. Another is the complete lack of physical attacks. Everything utilizes one of four magical elements: Fire, Ice Storm, Thunder, and Bayoen. Some enemies are weaker against one particular magic attack than another.

Games in the series

Remakes

Disc Station

See also
 Sorcery Saga: Curse of the Great Curry God released in 2013

Notes

References

External links
Hardcore Gaming 101

Puyo Puyo
Compile (company) games
MSX2 games
NEC PC-9801 games
Fantasy video games
Role-playing video games
Japan-exclusive video games
Video games developed in Japan
Video games featuring female protagonists
Windows games
1989 video games